The Commune by the Great Wall is a  SOHO China-managed boutique hotel, in Yanqing District, Beijing, China.

Description
The Commune by the Great Wall is near the Badaling section of the Great Wall. The Commune consists of private villas designed by twelve Asian architects. It also houses corporate functions, weddings, film shoots, and fashion shows. Its furniture and interior decoration were designed by Serge Mouille, Philippe Starck, Karim Rashid, Matthew Hilton, Marc Newson, and Michael Young.

Awards

The hotel's architecture was exhibited at La Biennale di Venezia in 2002 and was bestowed a special prize. Zhang Xin, the project's creator and investor, was recognized for her “bold personal initiative.” Centre Pompidou, in Paris, houses the exhibited model, as its first permanent collection from China.

References

External links 
Beijing Photos Beijing Photos
The Commune by the Great Wall— Official website
Images and profile at Specifier

Buildings and structures in Beijing
Great Wall of China
SOHO China
Kempinski Hotels